Kevin Devine (born December 9, 1954) is a Canadian former professional ice hockey player who played 288 games in the World Hockey Association and 2 games in the National Hockey League. He played for the  Indianapolis Racers, Quebec Nordiques, New York Islanders, and San Diego Mariners between 1974 and 1982.

Career statistics

Regular season and playoffs

External links

1954 births
Living people
Buffalo Sabres executives
Buffalo Sabres scouts
Canadian ice hockey left wingers
Ice hockey people from Prince Edward Island
Indianapolis Checkers (CHL) players
Indianapolis Racers players
New York Islanders players
Quebec Nordiques (WHA) players
San Diego Mariners draft picks
San Diego Mariners players
San Diego Mariners (PHL) players
Sportspeople from Charlottetown
Syracuse Blazers players
Toronto Maple Leafs draft picks
Toronto Marlboros players